Juan Paz may refer to:

 Juan Miguel Paz (born 1966), Colombian fencer
 Juan Bautista Paz (1772–1844), Argentine jurist and lawyer
 Juan Carlos Paz (1901–1972), Argentine composer and music theorist
 Juan José Paz (born 1980), Bolivian judoka
 Juan Pablo Paz (born 1959), Argentine physicist
 Juan Pablo Paz (tennis) (born 1995), Argentine tennis player